The Gubkin Russian State University of Oil and Gas is a public university in Moscow, Russia. The university was founded in 1930 and is named after the geologist Ivan Gubkin. The university is colloquially known as Kerosinka, meaning 'kerosene stove'.

During the Soviet period, the university, along with the Moscow State University of Railway Engineering, was known for admitting students of Jewish origin while other universities unofficially barred Jewish students.

Affiliates of the Gubkin institute exist in Orenburg and Tashkent (Uzbekistan).

Academics

Faculties and schools

Petroleum geology and geophysics 
The work of geologists and geophysicists is complex and multifaceted. Only detailed study of the structure of the Earth's deposits with the use of modern geophysical instruments and computer technologies can confidently identify oil and gas deposits at the depth of several kilometers. The Faculty trains geologists and geophysicists in a variety of areas and specializations of geoscience to meet the industry's needs.

Training is provided by a team of highly qualified and renowned researchers. Among them are Russian State Prize Laureates, Honored Scientists of the Russian Federation, Honored Geologists and Geophysicists.
The Faculty offers Bachelor, Master and Ph.D.  programs.

Departments
 Theory of Prospecting and Exploration of Oil and Gas
 Petroleum Field Geology
 Geology
 Geophysical Information Systems
 Exploration Geophysics and Computer Systems
 lithology and System Research of Lithosphere
 Geology of Hydrocarbon Systems

Aleksandr V.  Lobusev is author of more than 90 scientific papers. He is also   the holder of the patent: "Method of developing oil and gas fields”.  He is member of many renowned public organizations: the Society of Petroleum Engineers (SPE); Chairman of the Committee on Science of Gubkin University Academic Council, Public Council  of the Ministry of Natural Resources and Ecology of the Russian Federation, full member of the Academy of Natural Sciences of Russia.

Reservoir engineering 
Hydrocarbons are produced in Siberian blistering cold and in violent African heat, deep under the sea and in the desert. It is the reservoir engineer who plays the major role in this process of development and exploitation of oil and gas deposits.  The Faculty of Reservoir Engineering prepares professionals in drilling, well completion and simulation, development and exploitation of on- and offshore oil, gas and gas condensate fields, research in physics and hydraulics. Students of the Faculty receive in-depth knowledge in geology, economics, engineering mechanics, oil field chemicals and computer systems.

The Faculty offers a variety of Bachelor, Master and Ph.D. programs.

Departments
 Oil and Gas Wells Drilling 
 Petroleum Reservoir Engineering
 Gas and Gas-Condensate Reservoir Engineering
 Offshore Petroleum Reservoir Engineering
 Physics
 Petroleum and Subsurface Fluid Mechanics
 Gas Technologies and Underground Gas Storage
 Institute of Hydrocarbon Reservoir Engineering
 R&D Institute for Drilling Technologies
 Institute of Arctic Petroleum Technologies

Professor Bondarenko teaches the course on "Physics of oil and gas reservoir." He has published more than 40 scientific works. Professor Bovanenko is the Laureate of the Government of the Russian Federation in the field of Science and Technology, Honorary Person of Higher Professional Education of the Russian Federation.

Pipeline engineering, construction and operation 
Pipeline transport is the most important part of the fuel and energy complex. Often oil and gas fields are located in remote areas. Therefore, the effectiveness of the oil and gas industry is largely dependent on the reliable and safe operation of pipeline systems. The Faculty provides training in a wide range of subjects and programs related to pipeline engineering and operation.

The Faculty includes 75 professors giving lectures to the students on the fundamentals and cutting-edge developments in pipeline engineering.

The Faculty offers Bachelor, Master and Ph.D. programs.

Departments
 Gas and Oil Pipelines Engineering and Operation 
 Gas and Oil Pipelines and Storage Facilities Construction and Repair 
 Oil Products and Gas Supplies 
 Thermodynamics and Heat Engines 
 Welding and Monitoring of Oil and Gas Facilities

Professor Korolenok is author of over 110 scientific papers and textbooks for students, including 3 monographs and 12 scientific and technical reviews. He is Member of the Scientific and Technical Council of OAO "Gazprom". The research results of professor Korolenok were used to develop a number of industry practices and regulations, which were introduced into the practice of gas transportation companies such as "Gazprom", “Transneft", Rosneftegazstroy and others.

Mechanical engineering 
The question “What do the graduates of the Department of Mechanical Engineering do?” can be answered briefly and very clearly: they create machinery and installations for the oil and gas industry, and “teach” these how to work. They design and operate equipment, certify petroleum products and technologies, ensure the security of workers life, manage risks  related to industrial production, insure industrial objects and people - our graduates can do all this and many other things.
 
The Faculty offers Bachelor, Master and Ph.D. programs.

Departments
 Machines and Equipment for Oil and Gas  Industry
 Equipment for Oil Refining and Gas Processing
 Tribology and Repair Technology of Oil and Gas Equipment
 Welding and Monitoring of Oil and Gas Facilities
 Standardization, Certification and Quality Management of Oil and Gas Equipment Manufacturing
 Wear Resistance of Machines and Equipment & Structural Materials Engineering
 Industrial Safety and Environment Protection
 Computer Aided Design of Oil and Gas Industry Facilities
 Theoretical Mechanics
 Technical Mechanics
 Metal Science and Nonmetallic Materials

Other Units
 National Oil and Gas Institute
 International Training and Research Center «Anticor»
 Institute for Safety and Risk Analysis in Oil and Gas Sector
 Center for Integrated Analytical Studies
 Center for Advanced Manufacturing and Refurbishing Processes in Gas Sector Equipment

Professor Prygaev is author of more than 60 scientific papers, co-author of international translator and guide "Electrodes for manual arc welding" (2000). In 2012 the International Society for Engineering Education awarded professor Prygaev the title of “International Lecturer in Engineering”. In 2010 professor was awarded the title of the “Honored Person of Higher Education of the Russian Federation”.

Chemical and environmental engineering 
The areas of training offered by the Faculty are extremely diverse. For example, students at the Department of Oil Processing Technologies learn about the technology and processes for the production of petroleum products, explore indicators of quality for oil products  and raw materials, develop innovative solutions to improve the energy efficiency of processing plants. The Department of Gas Chemistry looks into the methods for obtaining substances and materials from hydrocarbon gases applying physical and chemical processes. The Department of Chemistry and Technology of Lubricants students master production technologies of motor oils, lubricants and fluids.

The Department of Technology of Chemicals for the Oil and Gas Industry does research in the field of development of drilling fluids, technologies for enhanced oil recovery and oil production intensification. The Department of Organic and Petroleum Chemistry trains specialists in the fields of hydrocarbon chemistry, heteroatomic and high-molecular compounds of petroleum, as well as their thermal and thermo-catalytic transformations. The Department of Physical and Colloid Chemistry students explore chemical phenomena using theoretical and experimental methods of physics. And finally the Department of Industrial Ecology students can master the environmental protection, waste utilization and other green technologies.

The Faculty offers Bachelor, Master and Ph.D. programs.

Departments
 Chemistry and Technology of Lubricants 
 Organic and Petroleum Chemistry
 Gas Chemistry
 Oil Processing Technologies
 General and Inorganic Chemistry
 Physical and Colloid Chemistry
 Technology of Chemicals for Oil and Gas Industry
 Industrial Ecology
 R&D Institute of Field Production Chemistry

Professor Tonkonogov is corresponding member of the Academy of Natural Sciences (2007), author of over 100 scientific works and inventions. Professor Tonkonogov gives lectures on the theory of chemical and technological processes of basic organic and petrochemical synthesis; theoretical foundations of chemical engineering of fuel energy and carbon materials; technology of production.

Automation and computer engineering 
The Faculty of Automation and Computer Engineering prepares specialists in the field of mathematical and computer modeling, design and effective use of computer technology, information-measuring and electrical systems and facilities, tools, automation and control systems. All educational programs of the Faculty are closely related with the tasks of oil and gas industry. The Faculty students receive in-depth training in physics and mathematics, studying information technology, mathematical methods of modeling and analysis of complex systems, acquire knowledge on the technology of designing and programming of modern information-measuring, computing and control systems.

The Faculty offers Bachelor, Master and Ph.D. programs.

Departments
 Advanced Mathematics
 Computer Science
 Automation of Technological Processes
 Automated Control Systems
 Theoretical Electrical Engineering and Electrification of Oil and Gas Industry
 Information and  Measuring Systems
 Applied Mathematics and Computer Simulation

Professor Khrabrov is engaged in scientific research in the field of information-measuring systems for measurement and control of multiphase flow production of oil, gas and gas condensate wells. He conducted research in the Urengoy and Orenburg gas condensate fields. He is author of 22 scientific and educational works and holds 2 patents.

Economics and management 
Graduates of the Faculty are able to successfully address challenges of the oil and gas industry. They work in governmental bodies, oil and gas companies, research and development organizations as economists, managers, financiers, marketers related to the oil and gas industry.

The Faculty of Economics and Management maintains close ties with universities in China, Germany, France, UK, USA, Holland, Norway, Sweden and other countries as we as with the international oil and gas majors such as Gazprom, Rosneft, BP, Statoil and others.

All educational programs in the Faculty are closely related with the tasks of oil and gas industry.

The Faculty offers Bachelor, Master and Ph.D. programs.

Departments
 Economic Theory
 Economics of Oil and Gas Industry
 Industrial Management
 Personnel and Labor Management 
 Financial Management
 Economics of Regional Energy and Energy Efficiency
 Energy Markets Research

International oil and gas business 
In line with the globalization process the petroleum business is becoming more and more international. To manage the business in international oil and gas companies the enrolment of professionals with specific knowledge of doing petroleum business internationally is required.

Therefore, becoming a top manager of oil and gas companies requires comprehensive education. The Faculty of International Oil and Gas Business offers Bachelor, Master and Ph.D. programs in the areas of Petroleum Economics and Management, Energy Trading, Energy Logistics, World Economy, Geopolitics and Strategic Resource Management.

Departments
 Oil and gas business
 Strategic management of energy 
 World economy and energy policy 
 Energy trading and logistics
 Innovative management
 International school of business

Professor Telegina is an expert in the Global Energy Security and World Energy Economics. In 1997- 1999 Dr. Telegina was Deputy Minister of Fuel and Energy of the Russian Federation and was responsible for international cooperation and investment in the energy sector of Russia. She worked as Deputy Chairman of the International Conference of the European Energy Charter. For many years Dr. Telegina has been member of the Council of Russian Oil Exporters Union.

School of law 
The study at the Gubkin School of Law gives students general and specific knowledge in the field of jurisprudence. Along with the general legal studies much attention is paid to the specificity of legal activities of enterprises and organizations in the oil and gas industry. The industry professionals from major oil and gas companies such as Gazprom, BP, Shell, TOTAL, and Governmental bodies (Supreme Court, Ministry of Natural Resources and Environment and others) as well as the experts of law and consulting firms (DLA Piper, Noland Consulting, Bureau of labor law) give the lectures in the School.

The Faculty offers Bachelor, Master and Ph.D. programs.

Departments
 Theory and History of State and Law
 Civil and Labor Law
 Civil Practice and Social branches of Law
 Natural Resource and Environmental Law
 Financial and Administrative Law
 Criminal Law and Criminology

School of humanities 
In addition to training students the School provides the Russian Language training course for international students in the framework of one year Preparatory course.

The School's main task is to develop in students’ patriotism, civic responsibility and team spirit, as well as their capability to maintain and contribute to the University and the national oil and gas sector traditions. The School includes the Museum of History of Gubkin Russian State University of Oil and Gas.

Departments
 Philosophy and Social and Political Technologies
 History
 Physical Education
 Russian Language
 Modern Languages
 Engineering Pedagogy

International school of business 
International School of Business offers business education aimed at improving management skills and development of leadership qualities, according to the global standards of training managers for oil, gas and energy business.
The knowledge and skills obtained in the School effectively address the challenges faced by senior managers of the international petroleum companies.

The School offers the Master (MBA) and Doctoral (DBA) Degrees in Business Administration.

Professor Telegina is an expert in the Global Energy Security and World Energy Economics. In 1997- 1999 Dr. Telegina was Deputy Minister of Fuel and Energy of the Russian Federation and was responsible for international cooperation and investment in the energy sector of Russia. She worked as Deputy Chairman of the International Conference of the European Energy Charter. For many years Dr. Telegina has been member of the Council of Russian Oil Exporters Union.

Degrees and programs

Bachelors 
Gubkin offers a wide range of Bachelor (4 years of study) programs related to various fields in the petroleum industry such as geology and petroleum engineering, mining law, petroleum economics and management, law and others.
All Bachelor Programs are Russian taught.

To learn the Russian Language in Gubkin, please refer to the one-year PREPARATORY COURSE Program.

Master programs 
Gubkin offers more than 50 Master Programs in all possible areas of Petroleum Industry.

The duration of Master Programs is 2 years (4 semesters).

These include regular Gubkin programs which are all Russian taught as well as Joint Master Programs which are English taught.

Doctoral programs 
Gubkin offers the opportunity to receive the degree of Candidate of Science (Ph.D.) in 17 scientific areas related to the petroleum industry, such as development, exploration, production, transportation, economics and others.
In this scientific framework the University offers 44 programs/majors to do the Ph.D. research in.

International cooperation

Academic cooperation
Gubkin University has cooperation agreements with many leading institutes and universities around the world.

The main fields of cooperation lie in the educational and research dimensions.

Cooperation in the field of education made it possible to offer Gubkin students the following options:
 English taught Joint Master programs between Gubkin and other universities
 Exchange programs for bachelor's and master's degree students
 Visiting programs for researchers and lecturers from Gubkin and other universities from Europe, America, etc.

University partners
The list of Gubkin University partners includes more than 120 universities around the world.

Among them are:
In N. America
 Colorado School of Mines 
 Texas A&M University 
 University of Calgary in Canada

In Asia-Pacific Region
 China University of Petroleum,  
 AJOY University in South Korea and many other well established education centers worldwide.

In Europe
 French Petroleum Institute (IFP, Paris)
 Imperial College (UK)
 Cambridge University (UK)
 Freiberg Mining Academy (Germany)
 Clausthal University of Technology (Germany)
 University of Stavanger (Norway)
 Royal Institute of Technology (Sweden)
 Mining University of Leoben (Austria)
 University of Groningen (Netherlands)

History
There was a task in the USSR – to prepare 435,000 engineers and technicians in 5 years (1930-1935) during the USSR industrialization period, while their number in 1929 was 66,000.

In 1930 the Moscow Mining Academy was divided into six independent institutes by the order of Supreme Soviet of the National Economy. The Petroleum Engineering Department of the Moscow Mining Academy became the base for the new Moscow Petroleum Institute. The Institute was named in honor of Academician Ivan Gubkin, “who contributed greatly to the foundation of higher education aimed at (of training engineers, needed urgently for the socialist industry”. At this time the young Soviet state was in want of fuel and energy for industrial development. The petroleum industry faced new challenges such as the development of new fields, application of advanced methods of operation, introduction of new production technologies, further development of oil refining technologies and construction of new plants, electrification of the oil industry, as well as the planning, organization and improving the safety of petroleum production.

None of these problems could be solved without significant increase in the number of petroleum engineers and Gubkin Institute became the main base for preparing such specialists.

At the beginning there were only three faculties at the University, namely: Geology and Oil Exploration, Petroleum Engineering and Refining.

The first Rector of the University and the founders of its educational and research schools was its namesake Ivan M. Gubkin.

From 1941 to 1943, during World War II, the University was evacuated to Ufa.

Nowadays there are more than ten teaching faculties at Gubkin preparing specialists in almost every field of the petroleum industry: from petroleum geology and engineering to energy economics and trading.
Since the University's establishment more than 85,000 students have been graduated from Gubkin.

Notable alumni 

Roman Abramovich – billionaire businessman, investor, and politician. owner of the private investment company Millhouse LLC, and Chelsea Football Club.
Teki Biçoku – Albanian geologist
Vladimir Entov – applied mathematician and physicist
Edward Frenkel – Russian-American mathematician 
Pavel Etingof - Russian-American mathematician
Alexander Givental – mathematician
Yury Luzhkov – politician who was the Mayor of Moscow and one of the founders of the ruling United Russia party
Mikhail Men - statesman, entrepreneur, musician, composer, producer
Leonid Nevzlin – Russian-born Israeli former executive at Yukos, also owns 20% of Haaretz
Vasiliy Podshibyakin – discoverer of Urengoy gas field the world's second largest natural gas field
Urban Rusnák – Slovak diplomat and the current general-secretary of the Energy Charter Secretariat
Aliya Mustafina – gymnast
Vladimir Sorokin – contemporary Russian writer and dramatist, one of the most popular in modern Russian literature
Fazila Samadova - academic, chemical engineer technologist
Arkady Volozh – founder and CEO of Yandex
Eugene Shvidler – Russian-American oil businessman
Vladislav Ignatov – businessman and politician
Sergey Donskoy – politician

See also 
 List of Russian geologists

References

External links 
 Official Homepage 
 Alumni community on Live Journal

 
Educational institutions established in 1930
Universities in Moscow
Universities and institutes established in the Soviet Union
Petroleum engineering schools
Technical universities and colleges in Russia
Fossil fuels in the Soviet Union
1930 establishments in Russia
National research universities in Russia